Saladas is a town in Corrientes Province, Argentina, established on November 19, 1732  from the provincial capital.

It is the administrative seat of Saladas Department.

Saladas is the birthplace of Juan Bautista Cabral (born 1789), a soldier in the war of independence.

External links

 Saladas website

Populated places in Corrientes Province
Populated places established in 1732
1732 establishments in the Spanish Empire
Cities in Argentina
Corrientes Province
Argentina